To Better Days is a 2012 Turkish drama film directed by Hasan Tolga Pulat.

Cast 
 Uğur Polat as İzzet
 Nesrin Cavadzade as Anna
 Buğra Gülsoy as Cumali
 Feride Çetin as Figen
Barış Atay as Ali

References

External links 

2012 drama films
2012 films
Turkish drama films